Deeble is a surname. Notable people with the surname include:

Elizabeth Deeble (1899–1972), American journalist 
Helen Deeble, British businesswoman
Jason Deeble (born 1979), American author and illustrator
Jon Deeble (born 1962), Australian baseball coach
Olivia Deeble (born 2002), Australian actress
Robert Deeble (born 1966), American singer-songwriter